Synan is a surname and given name. Notable people with the surname include:
 Edward A. Synan (1918–1997), American philosopher and theologian
 Edward John Synan (1820–1887), Irish politician
 H. Vinson Synan (1934–2020), American historian of Pentecostalism 

As a given name, it may refer to:
 Synan Braddish (born 1958), Irish footballer

See also
 Sinan, Arabic given name and surname